Fulvius is a genus of plant bugs in the subfamily Cylapinae.

Species 
Fulvius albonotatus - Fulvius amapaensis - Fulvius angustatus - Fulvius anthocorides - Fulvius anthocoroides - Fulvius barrerai - Fulvius bidentatus - Fulvius bifenestratus - Fulvius bimaculatus - Fulvius bisbistillatus - Fulvius bolivianus - Fulvius breddini - Fulvius brevipilis - Fulvius brunneiceps - Fulvius carumbensis - Fulvius castaneus - Fulvius chiriquinus - Fulvius colombianus - Fulvius costaricensis - Fulvius dallastai - Fulvius dapensis - Fulvius dimidiatus - Fulvius discifer - Fulvius dubius - Fulvius flaveolus - Fulvius flavicornis - Fulvius fuscans - Fulvius gamobensis - Fulvius geniculatus - Fulvius guapimirinus - Fulvius imbecilis - Fulvius itabiritensis - Fulvius kajae - Fulvius kerzhneri - Fulvius lunulatus - Fulvius macgillavryi - Fulvius major - Fulvius malinalcanus - Fulvius mateusi - Fulvius mexicanus - Fulvius minimus - Fulvius morelensis - Fulvius nicaraguensis - Fulvius nigricornis - Fulvius niveonotatus - Fulvius obscuricornis - Fulvius ornatifrons - Fulvius ornatifrontoides - Fulvius oxycarenoides - Fulvius pallens - Fulvius pallidus - Fulvius paranaensis - Fulvius pictus - Fulvius praefectus - Fulvius puertoricensis - Fulvius quadristillatus - Fulvius satipoensis - Fulvius sauteri - Fulvius sigwaltae - Fulvius simillimus - Fulvius slateri - Fulvius stillatipennis - Fulvius stysi - Fulvius submaculatus - Fulvius subnitens - Fulvius tagalicus - Fulvius tanzanicus - Fulvius thetis - Fulvius tuxtlensis - Fulvius unicolor - Fulvius ussuriensis - Fulvius variegatus - Fulvius venezuelanus - Fulvius vicosensis - Fulvius webbi

References 

 Chérot, F.; Gorczyca, J. 2008: Fulvius stysi, a new species of Cylapinae (Hemiptera: Heteroptera: Miridae) from Papua New Guinea. Acta Entomologica Musei Nationalis Pragae, 48: 371–376.
 Gorczyca, J. 2002: Notes on the genus Fulvius Stål from the Oriental Region and New Guinea (Heteroptera: Miridae: Cylapinae). Genus, 13: 9–23.
 Schuh, R.T. 2008. On-line Systematic Catalog of Plant Bugs (Insecta: Heteroptera: Miridae).
 Sadowska-Woda, I.; Chérot, F.; Malm, T. 2008: A preliminary phylogenetic analysis of the genus Fulvius Stål (Hemiptera: Miridae: Cylapinae) based on molecular data. Insect systematics & evolution, 39: 407–417.
 Sadowska-Woda, I.; Gorczyca, J. 2008: Genus, 19(1): 15–19.
 Henry, T.J.; Hoffman, R.L.; Wolski, A. 2011: First North American Record of the Old World Cylapine Fulvius subnitens Poppius (Hemiptera: Heteroptera: Miridae) from Virginia, with Descriptions and a Key to the U.S. Species of Fulvius. Proceedings of the Entomological Society of Washington, 113(2): 127–136.

External links 
 

Miridae genera
Cylapinae